Freeman White II (born December 17, 1943) is a former American football end who played four seasons with the New York Giants of the National Football League (NFL). He was drafted by the New York Giants in the ninth round of the 1966 NFL Draft. Freeman was also drafted by the Denver Broncos in the second round of the 1966 AFL Draft. He played college football at the University of Nebraska–Lincoln and attended Chadsey High School in Detroit, Michigan. He was also a member of the Ottawa Rough Riders of the Canadian Football League. He was a Consensus All-American in 1965. He was named First-team All-Big 8 in 1964 and 1965. He served as the defensive coordinator of the Oakland Raiders from 1996 to 1997.

References

External links
Just Sports Stats
College stats

Living people
1943 births
Players of American football from Montgomery, Alabama
American football ends
American football wide receivers
American football tight ends
American football linebackers
Canadian football ends
African-American players of American football
African-American players of Canadian football
Nebraska Cornhuskers football players
New York Giants players
Ottawa Rough Riders players
All-American college football players
Sportspeople from Montgomery, Alabama
Oakland Raiders coaches
National Football League defensive coordinators
21st-century African-American people
20th-century African-American sportspeople